Adolf von Hildebrand (6 October 1847 – 18 January 1921) was a German sculptor.

Life

Hildebrand was born at Marburg, the son of Marburg economics professor Bruno Hildebrand. He studied at the Academy of Fine Arts Nuremberg, with Kaspar von Zumbusch at the Munich Academy and with Rudolf Siemering in Berlin. From 1873 he lived in Florence in the St Francesco Monastery, a secularized sixteenth-century monastery.

A friend of Hans von Marées, he designed the architectural setting for the painter's murals  in the library of the German Marine Zoological Institute at Naples (1873). He spent a significant  amount of time in Munich after 1889, executing a monumental fountain there, the Wittelsbacher Brunnen. He is known for five monumental urban fountains and for the Bismarck monument in Bremen, unveiled in 1910.

Hildebrand worked in a Neo-classical tradition, and set out his artistic theories in his book  Das Problem der Form in der Bildenden Kunst ("The Problem of Form in Painting and Sculpture"), published in 1893.

He was ennobled by the King of Bavaria in 1904.

He died in Munich in 1921.

Family

In 1877 he married Irene Schäuffelen. They were parents of the painter Eva, Elizabeth, sculptor Irene Georgii-Hildebrand, Sylvie, Bertele, and Catholic theologian Dietrich von Hildebrand.

Critical opinion
In 1917, the American sculptor, conservative critic and author Lorado Taft, while bemoaning the direction the German sculpture was moving in, described Hildebrand as:a master of the old school and Florentine tradition, whose example has been a constant gospel of good taste and sanity. Even today, when the whole world has gone after false gods, his influence continues to be felt and I wonder if the fact that in the midst of this revolution German sculpture, however fantastic, remains essentially sculpture, is not due largely to the life long precept and practice of this admirable representative of the craft.

See also
 Girl Playing the Lute
 Girl Playing the Lyre

References

 World Wide Art Resources
 Dietrich von Hildebrand: the Soul of a Lion, by Alice von Hildebrand (Ignatius, 2000)
 Adolph von Hildebrand page
 Encyclopædia Britannica Vol. 11, pp 491–492 (1971)

External links

 Problem of Form 1901/1918
  Double Portrait of the Artist's Daughters in the collection of the J. Paul Getty Museum

1847 births
1921 deaths
Modern sculptors
Adolf
People from the Electorate of Hesse
People from Marburg
Academy of Fine Arts, Nuremberg alumni
20th-century German sculptors
20th-century male artists
German male sculptors
German untitled nobility
19th-century sculptors
Recipients of the Pour le Mérite (civil class)